Nicola da Forca Palena (10 September 1349 - 1 October 1449) was an Italian Roman Catholic professed member of the Third Order of Saint Francis and the co-founder of the Poor Hermits of Saint Jerome - founded alongside Blessed Pietro Gambacorta. He established the Sant'Onofrio church in Rome where he was later buried. He became a friend to both Pope Eugene IV and Pope Nicholas V.

His beatification received formal approval from Pope Clement XIV on 27 August 1771 after the pontiff acknowledged the fact that there was a local 'cultus' - or popular devotion - to the late religious that endured since his death.

Life

Nicola da Forca Palena was born in a modest house in Forca - in Chieri - on 10 September 1349 to devout and modest parents. On the previous day, 9 September 1349, a devastating earthquake had struck the region and the surrounding areas.

He became a professed member of the Third Order of Saint Francis and became noted for penitential acts and those austere methods that defined his life. He undertook a pilgrimage to Rome where he visited the tombs of each of the apostles and there felt a call to lead a more austere mode of life. He decided to join several companions to live the life of solitude that the group craved and so he decided to retire to a hermitage. He moved to one such place in Rome and later moved to another one in Naples before returning to Rome once more in 1419. He founded the Santa Maria della Grazie hermitage in Sperlonga in Naples and a hospice at the square of Sant'Agnello. Nicola attended the Jubilee in 1400 that Pope Boniface IX presided over.

Nicola served as the curate to the Sant'Antonio church in Palena in 1379.

He later met Pietro Gambacorta and the pair founded the Poor Hermits of Saint Jerome in Rome. Pope Eugene IV later heard of his reputation for holiness and so entrusted him to the direction of several convents in Florence in 1434 and in 1437; the same pontiff would later issue full papal approval to the order he and Gambacora founded together in 1446 after Pope Martin V had issued the initial approval in 1421. Nicola also founded the Sant'Onofrio church in Rome in 1439. Construction funds came from various donors including Cardinal Gabriele Condulmer - the future Pope Eugene IV.

Nicola died on 1 October 1449 and his remains were interred in the church that he himself established. His remains were laid out for just under a week for the faithful and he was then buried under the floor of the church. His friend Pope Nicholas V dictated the sepulchral inscription. His remains were then moved to the main altar in 1712 where it now rests.

The Poor Hermits of Saint Jerome was dissolved under Pope Pius XI on 12 January 1933. Sant'Onofrio became a titular see for cardinals since 1519 when Pope Leo X elevated it and it included three pontiffs such as Pope Innocent XI. The church - since 1945 - has been the headquarters of the Order of the Holy Sepulchre.

Beatification
The beatification process culminated on 27 August 1771 after Pope Clement XIV issued a formal decree that ratified the fact that there existed a spontaneous and enduring local 'cultus' - otherwise known as popular veneration - to the late friar.

Since 14 March 1638 - under the directive of Pope Urban VIII - he has been the patron of both Forca - his hometown - and Palena.

References

External links
Ecumenical Franciscans

1349 births
1449 deaths
14th-century venerated Christians
14th-century Italian Christian monks
15th-century venerated Christians
15th-century Italian Christian monks
Founders of Catholic religious communities
Franciscan beatified people
Italian beatified people
Italian centenarians
Italian Franciscans
Members of the Third Order of Saint Francis
People from Chieti
Venerated Catholics
Men centenarians